Jocara cristalis is a species of snout moth in the genus Jocara. It was described by Cajetan Felder, Rudolf Felder and Alois Friedrich Rogenhofer in 1875. It is found in Brazil.

References

Moths described in 1875
Jocara
Moths of South America
Taxa named by Alois Friedrich Rogenhofer